Anadia altaserrania is a species of lizard in the family Gymnophthalmidae. It is endemic to Sierra Nevada de Santa Marta, Colombia.

References

Anadia (genus)
Reptiles of Colombia
Endemic fauna of Colombia
Reptiles described in 1987
Taxa named by Dennis M. Harris
Taxa named by Stephen Charles Ayala